Daniel Altmaier (born 12 September 1998) is a German professional tennis player. He has a career high ATP singles ranking of world No. 53, achieved on 23 May 2022.

Tennis career

2017: ATP debut
Altmaier made his ATP main draw debut as a qualifier at the 2017 Geneva Open, defeating Alexander Ward and Petr Michnev in qualifying. He lost to Sam Querrey in the first round.

He won his first ATP tour-level match as a lucky loser at the 2017 Antalya Open when he beat Víctor Estrella Burgos. In the next round, he defeated wildcard Marsel İlhan to reach the quarterfinals, where he lost to Yūichi Sugita. Both of his victories were decided by a third set tiebreak.

2020: Grand Slam debut & fourth round & first top-10 win
Shoulder and hip injuries held back Altmaier’s progress in his tennis career, but victories in qualifying over Tallon Griekspoor and Ruben Bemelmans led to his Grand Slam debut at the 2020 French Open, where he defeated Feliciano Lopez, 30th seed Jan-Lennard Struff and 7th seed Matteo Berrettini, all of them in straight sets. In the fourth round, he lost to Pablo Carreño Busta.

2021: Top 100 debut
Altmaier made his debut in the  top 100 on 15 November 2021 at World No. 98 following the final at the 2021 Knoxville Challenger. He followed this by winning his third Challenger title for the year at the 2021 Puerto Vallarta Open.

2022: Grand Slam debut at three majors, top 60
He made his Grand Slam debut at the 2022 Australian Open and 2022 Wimbledon Championships.

At the 2022 US Open also on his debut, he took Jannik Sinner to five sets in his first round match.

Singles performance timeline 

Current through the 2023 Abierto Mexicano Telcel.

ATP Challenger and ITF Futures finals

Singles: 26 (15–11)

Doubles: 11 (6–5)

Record against top 10 players
Altmaier's record against players who have been ranked in the top 10, with those who are active in boldface. Only ATP Tour main draw and Davis Cup matches are considered:

Top 10 wins

References

External links
 
 
 
 

1998 births
Living people
German male tennis players
Tennis people from North Rhine-Westphalia